Nollen Cornelius Leni is a Solomon Islands politician. He was a member of the National Parliament of the Solomon Islands between 2001 and 2010, representing the East Central Guadalcanal constituency. He also served as Minister for Fisheries and Marine Resources. He was Minister of Foreign Affairs briefly in 2002.

References
Member page at Parliament website

Year of birth missing (living people)
Living people
Members of the National Parliament of the Solomon Islands
People from Guadalcanal Province
Place of birth missing (living people)
Foreign Ministers of the Solomon Islands
Fisheries and Marine Resources ministers of the Solomon Islands